Federico "Freddie" M. García (born July 13, 1944), also known as FMG, is a Filipino business executive who served as President of ABS-CBN Corporation, the largest media conglomerate in the Philippines, from May 26, 1997 to December 31, 2003, as well as one of the company's board of directors.

Personal life 
García attended the College of Business Administration at the University of the Philippines Diliman.

Career 
García began his career with ABS-CBN as sales executive in 1966 until 1972, when the network was shut down following the declaration of Martial law in the Philippines. He then moved to GMA Radio Television Arts from 1974 to 1986.

García rejoined ABS-CBN in 1987 as Executive Vice-President and General Manager. He became its president and chief operating officer in 1998 and retired from the network in 2003. He rejoined ABS-CBN as a director and management consultant in 2006.

Pilipinas Got Talent 
In 2010, García joined as a judge of Pilipinas Got Talent until midway to its sixth season.

See also 
ABS-CBN Corporation
Pilipinas Got Talent
Charo Santos-Concio

References

External links 
 

1944 births
Living people
ABS-CBN executives
20th-century Filipino businesspeople
University of the Philippines Diliman alumni